The BIG 25 Berlin is an annual road running competition over 25 kilometres that takes place in Berlin, Germany in early May.

The competition was created in 1981 by the French Forces in Berlin stationed in West Berlin and was titled the "25 km de Berlin". The soldiers were able to block the roads from traffic for the event and this allowed the race to become Berlin's first ever mass race to be held in the city centre. Under a similar agreement, the Berlin Marathon took place in the city that same year. The course for the BIG 25 Berlin runs on major streets of the city and passes some of the city's most prominent landmarks, including the Berlin Victory Column, the Brandenburg Gate, Potsdamer Platz, Friedrichstraße and Kurfürstendamm. The course begins at Olympischer Platz and the finishing line is placed on the track within the Olympic Stadium.

It is one of the most high profile annual international races to be held over the 25 km distance and has been the site of six world records for the 25 km (five by men and one by a woman). The current course records are both the current world records: Dennis Kimetto set the men's record of 1:11:18 hours in 2012, while Mary Keitany holds the women's record of 1:19:53 hours set in 2010.

In the first edition, 3250 runners started the event and ten years later this had grown to over 14,000 runners, making it the most popular road running event in Germany at that point. In the years since then, the event has expanded its programme and now includes in-line skating races and a half marathon. A total of 10,478 people took part at the 2012 edition of the event. The elite aspect of the main 25 km race has attracted top level national and foreign runners since its inception. On the women's side, past winners include marathon world record breaker Christa Vahlensieck, world road running champion Lornah Kiplagat and 1988 Olympic marathon champion Rosa Mota. Past men's winners include Olympic medalist Markus Ryffel, Boston and New York marathon winner Rodgers Rop, and marathon world record holder Patrick Makau Musyoki.

Originally organised by the Berlin Athletics Association (Berliner Leichtathletik-Verband), the organising duties were passed to Gerhard Janetzky (the Internationales Stadionfest director) and Christoph Kopp (a former association president) in 2007. The competition is colloquially known as "the French course", due to its origins, and has also been named the "Berlin Läuft 25km" and "Run Berlin".

Past winners

Key:

References

List of winners
Berlin 25 km. Association of Road Racing Statisticians (2012-05-05). Retrieved on 2012-05-06.

External links
Official website

Long-distance running competitions
Sports competitions in Berlin
Athletics competitions in Germany
Road running competitions
Recurring sporting events established in 1981
1981 establishments in Germany
Annual events in Berlin
Annual sporting events in Germany
Athletics in Berlin
Inline speed skating competitions
25K runs